Burthwaite is a village in Cumbria, England.

The history of Burthwaite is synonymous with the history of Blackhall Park Estate 
also called Blackwell Park in some records.  Until recent times the owner of Blackhall Park
also owned all eight cottages, the two farms of Orchard House, Burthwaite Croft and the 
small holding of Burthwaite Villa (now Thwaite House).  A web site of the history researched by villagers is at http://burthwaite.weebly.com/

This historical report begins with the birth of John Pearson christened on 23 Oct 1787 son of Adam Pearson farmer of Bell Bridge Sebergham, his wife Elizabeth.

Villages in Cumbria
City of Carlisle